This is a list of listed buildings in Wales, which are among the listed buildings of the United Kingdom.

Key

The organization of the lists is on the same basis as the statutory register. County names are those used in the register, which in the case of Wales means they are broadly based on the ceremonial counties and do not always match the current administrative areas.

Grade I listed buildings

Grade II* listed buildings

Listed buildings in Wales by Principal Area

Blaenau Gwent

 Listed buildings in Abertillery
 Listed buildings in Badminton, Blaenau Gwent
 Listed buildings in Beaufort, Blaenau Gwent
 Listed buildings in Blaina
 Listed buildings in Brynmawr
 Listed buildings in Cwm, Blaenau Gwent
 Listed buildings in Cwmtillery
 Listed buildings in Ebbw Vale North
 Listed buildings in Ebbw Vale South
 Listed buildings in Georgetown, Blaenau Gwent
 Listed buildings in Llanhilleth
 Listed buildings in Nantyglo
 Listed buildings in Rassau
 Listed buildings in Sirhowy
 Listed buildings in Six Bells
 Listed buildings in Tredegar Central and West

Bridgend

 Listed buildings in Aberkenfig
 Listed buildings in Bettws, Bridgend
 Listed buildings in Blackmill
 Listed buildings in Blaengarw
 Listed buildings in Brackla
 Listed buildings in Bryncethin
 Listed buildings in Bryncoch
 Listed buildings in Bryntirion, Laleston and Merthyr Mawr
 Listed buildings in Caerau, Bridgend
 Listed buildings in Cefn Cribwr
 Listed buildings in Cefn Glas
 Listed buildings in Coity
 Listed buildings in Cornelly
 Listed buildings in Coychurch Lower
 Listed buildings in Felindre
 Listed buildings in Hendre, Bridgend
 Listed buildings in Litchard
 Listed buildings in Llangeinor
 Listed buildings in Llangewydd & Brynhyfryd
 Listed buildings in Llangynwyd
 Listed buildings in Maesteg East
 Listed buildings in Maesteg West
 Listed buildings in Morfa, Bridgend
 Listed buildings in Nant-y-Moel
 Listed buildings in Newcastle, Bridgend
 Listed buildings in Newton, Bridgend
 Listed buildings in Nottage
 Listed buildings in Ogmore Vale
 Listed buildings in Oldcastle, Bridgend
 Listed buildings in Pendre
 Listed buildings in Penprysg
 Listed buildings in Pen-y-fai, Bridgend
 Listed buildings in Pontycymmer
 Listed buildings in Porthcawl East Central
 Listed buildings in Porthcawl West Central
 Listed buildings in Pyle
 Listed buildings in Rest Bay
 Listed buildings in Sarn, Bridgend
 Listed buildings in Ynysawdre

Caerphilly

 Listed buildings in Aberbargoed
 Listed buildings in Abercarn
 Listed buildings in Aber Valley
 Listed buildings in Argoed, Caerphilly
 Listed buildings in Bargoed
 Listed buildings in Bedwas, Trethomas and Machen
 Listed buildings in Blackwood, Caerphilly
 Listed buildings in Cefn Fforest
 Listed buildings in Crosskeys
 Listed buildings in Crumlin, Caerphilly
 Listed buildings in Darran Valley
 Listed buildings in Gilfach
 Listed buildings in Hengoed
 Listed buildings in Llanbradach
 Listed buildings in Maesycwmmer
 Listed buildings in Morgan Jones
 Listed buildings in Moriah, Caerphilly
 Listed buildings in Nelson, Caerphilly
 Listed buildings in Newbridge, Caerphilly
 Listed buildings in New Tredegar
 Listed buildings in Pengam
 Listed buildings in Penmain
 Listed buildings in Penyrheol, Caerphilly
 Listed buildings in Pontllanfraith
 Listed buildings in Pontlottyn
 Listed buildings in Risca East
 Listed buildings in Risca West
 Listed buildings in St. Cattwg
 Listed buildings in St. James, Caerphilly
 Listed buildings in St. Martins, Caerphilly
 Listed buildings in Twyn Carno
 Listed buildings in Ynysddu
 Listed buildings in Ystrad Mynach

See also

Cadw
List of castles in Wales
List of monastic houses in Wales
Scheduled Monuments in Wales
Royal Commission on the Ancient and Historical Monuments of Wales
Listed buildings in Cardiff
Listed buildings in the Vale of Glamorgan
Listed buildings in England
Listed buildings in Scotland
Listed buildings in Northern Ireland

References

External links
Listed buildings by county in Wales at britishlistedbuildings.co.uk